Dave Mason is a 1974 album by Dave Mason and was released on the CBS Records label (a subsidiary of Columbia Records). It was reissued on CD on the One Way label in 1995. This album marked a major change in Mason's sound after his blues rock sound with his Blue Thumb Records releases, blending pop rock and yacht rock.

Reception

Allmusic gave a brief but positive retrospective review of the album, giving particular praise to the tracks "Show Me Some Affection," "Every Woman," and "All Along the Watchtower."

Track listing
All tracks composed by Dave Mason; except where indicated

Side one
 "Show Me Some Affection" - 4:14
 "Get Ahold On Love" - 2:41
 "Every Woman" - 2:58
 "It Can't Make Any Difference To Me" (Lane Tietgen) - 2:15
 "All Along the Watchtower" (Bob Dylan) - 4:03

Side two
 "Bring It On Home to Me" (Sam Cooke) - 2:53
 "Harmony and Melody" - 3:35
 "Relation Ships" - 5:03
 "You Can't Take It When You Go" - 4:08

CD track listing
 "Show Me Some Affection"
 "Get Ahold On Love"
 "Every Woman"
 "It Can't Make Any Difference To Me"
 "All Along the Watchtower"
 "Bring It On Home to Me"
 "Harmony & Melody"
 "Relation Ships"
 "You Can't Take It When You Go"

Personnel and Production
The Dave Mason Band
Dave Mason - guitar, lead vocals
Mike Finnigan - keyboards, vocals
Bob Glaub - bass
Rick Jaeger - drums
Jim Krueger - guitar (lead solo on tracks 4,6,7), vocals

with:
Richard Bennett - pedal steel guitar
Gary Barone, Jerry Jumonville, Jock Ellis, Sal Marquez - horn section
Tim Weisberg - flute
Horns arranged by Dave Mason and Mike Finnigan
Strings written and arranged by Nick DeCaro
Harry Bluestone - concertmaster
Recording and Mixing Engineer : Al Schmitt
Assistant Engineer : Linda Tyler

Chart positions

References

1974 albums
Dave Mason albums
Columbia Records albums
Albums produced by Dave Mason